The 1977 Cleveland Browns season was the team's 28th season with the National Football League. After a 6-4 start, the Browns lost their final four games of the season, to finish with a disappointing 6-8 record. With one game left in the season, head coach Forrest Gregg was fired and replaced by Dick Modzelewski.

Offseason

NFL Draft 
The following were selected in the 1977 NFL Draft.

Personnel

Staff / Coaches

Roster

Preseason

Schedule

Note: Intra-division opponents are in bold text.

Game summaries

Week 1 
The 1977 season started with a league rival and an impressive win.

Week 2 
The Cleveland Browns had not hosted nor been in a Monday Night Football game since the 1973 season, when they lost at home against the Miami Dolphins. The Cleveland Stadium was sold out that beautiful night along the lakefront and the crowd looked forward to a great game. Indeed, the game went into overtime, and with a little more than 10 minutes left in over time, Don Cockroft kicked a 35-yard field goal to end the game with a win for the Browns. Howard Cosell said that it was one of the most exciting finishes to a Monday Night Football game that he ever witnessed.

Week 3 vs Steelers

Week 5 
The Browns beat the Oilers 24-23 on another Cockroft last-second field goal. Toni Fritsch kicks a 37-yarder with 4:28 left to give Houston a 23-21 lead, but running back Greg Pruitt leads the Browns on their final scoring drive with three runs and a 13-yard third-down completion to Cleo Miller. Cockroft's six points lift him past Jim Brown to the no. 2 spot (behind Lou Groza) on the Browns' all-time scoring list.

Week 7 
Scoring their most points in 9 years, the Browns broke a team record with 34 first downs while rolling up 526 yards (322 rushing) in a rout over the Kansas City Chiefs 44-7. Greg Pruitt rushed for 153 yards. Brian Sipe threw for 200 yards and tight end Gary Parris caught two touchdown passes.

Standings

References

External links 
 1977 Cleveland Browns at Pro Football Reference
 1977 Cleveland Browns Statistics at jt-sw.com
 1977 Cleveland Browns Schedule at jt-sw.com
 1977 Cleveland Browns at DatabaseFootball.com  

Cleveland
Cleveland Browns seasons
Cleveland Browns